Nanjing Ange Pharmaceutical Co., Ltd. is a pharmaceutical company in Nanjing, in the People's Republic of China, specializing in the development of “New Drugs” (the drugs that previously have not been marketed in China, i.e., New Chemical Entities for China's FDA) as well as the research, development, production and trade of chemical APIs and pharmaceutical intermediates.

Company Profile
Ange was founded in 2003, and is now a leading company in the Chinese pharmaceutical industry. With almost every major university in Nanjing Ange has established cooperative relationships and laboratories, including China Pharmaceutical University, China's first independent school of pharmacy and one of the few institutes with complete pharmaceutical fields.

Main Products
Ange's main products are Antineoplastic medicines, which include:
 Sunitinib
 Lapatinib
 Nilotinib
 Dasatinib 
 Gefitinib
 Erlotinib
 Imatinib 
 Canertinib

It also produces relative pharmaceutical intermediates.

Recent Projects
In the past 2 years, Ange has been working with Abbott Laboratories Ltd. and Simcere Pharmaceutical Group, etc.

References

External links
Ange Official Web Site 

Pharmaceutical companies of China
Companies based in Nanjing
Biotechnology companies established in 2003
Pharmaceutical companies established in 2003
Chinese companies established in 2003
Biotechnology companies of China
Chinese brands